Francesco De Rocchi (1902 in Saronno – 1978 in Milan) was an Italian painter.

Biography
De Rocchi studied art at the Brera Academy in Milan from 1916 to 1926. He started an association with the Novecento Italiano movement in the second half of the 1920s. His maiden participation to the Venice Biennale was on the occasion of the 15th edition in 1926. In 1927 the Galleria d'Arte Moderna, Milan bought one of his works and in 1929 he took part in the Seconda Mostra del Novecento Italiano in Milan. De Rocchi's involvement with the Chiarismo movement in the 1930s was expressed by a lightening of colour and reduction of volume in his work. In 1937 he obtained a teaching post at the Brera Academy in 1937 and in 1939 he won the Bergamo Prize. Mostly based in Milan, he continued to paint and exhibit after World War II, with frequent stays in Venice and Versilia.

Notable Paintings

References
 Antonella Crippa, Francesco De Rocchi, online catalogue Artgate by Fondazione Cariplo, 2010, CC BY-SA (source for the first revision of this article).
 Elena Pontiggia, Francesco De Rocchi: L'apparizione della luce, Fondazione Stelline, Milan, 1998.

Other projects

20th-century Italian painters
20th-century Italian male artists
Italian male painters
Italian contemporary artists
Painters from Milan
Brera Academy alumni
Academic staff of Brera Academy
1902 births
1978 deaths